Mark Ko'cass is an Australian former professional rugby league footballer who played in the 1980s. He played for Parramatta and St. George in the New South Wales Rugby League (NSWRL) competition.

Playing career
Ko'cass made his first-grade debut in round 12 of the 1986 NSWRL season against Canberra at Parramatta Stadium. Ko'cass played three games for Parramatta as they won their fourth premiership that year. In 1987, Ko'cass joined St. George and played 16 games as the starting halfback. His final game in the top grade was a 34–16 loss against his old side Parramatta in round 25 of the 1987 NSWRL season.

References

Parramatta Eels players
St. George Dragons players
Australian rugby league players
Rugby league halfbacks
Living people
Year of birth missing (living people)